The Second Form at Malory Towers is a children's novel by Enid Blyton set in an English boarding school. It is the second book in the Malory Towers school story series. The novel was published in 1947 by Methuen Publishing. The first edition was illustrated by Stanley Lloyd, both the dust jacket and the inner illustrations. It has been reprinted 20 times, the most recent being in 2019. The Second Form at Malory Towers has a rating of 4.06 stars on Goodreads.

Plot summary 
It is Darrell’s fifth term at Malory Towers. Along with most of her classmates, she moves up to the Second Form under Form Mistress Miss Parker. 
Former Head of Form, Katherine, has moved up to the Third Form and Violet has disappeared from the stories. In their place in North Tower are three new girls: Belinda Morris, Ellen Wilson and Daphne Milicent Turner.

Belinda turns out to be as much of a scatterbrain as Irene and the two are instantly drawn to each other, to the despair of their teachers. Her new schoolfriends, on the other hand, are delighted to discover Belinda’s talent for drawing, enabling her to trade many of her chores in return for caricatures of teachers. The reader is given an early hint that Daphne may not be all she seems. On the face of it she is pretty, charming and talks of having a very wealthy family. Gwendoline, vain and snobbish as ever, claims her for a friend.

Ellen is a scholarship girl.  A running theme of the book is her increasing bad temper, caused by her worrying about succeeding at Malory Towers and overworking. Sally asks Jean to try and befriend Ellen and help her settle down, but her efforts are rejected. As the term moves on, Ellen becomes increasingly irritable and unwell, and eventually has to spend eleven days in the sanatorium. This makes things worse for her as she worries about missing lessons and falling further behind.

A feud develops between the two Mam’zelles. Each has different ideas about which girls should be cast in two French plays, with Mam’zelle Dupont favouring Daphne and Mam’zelle Rougier having entirely different ideas. Belinda is inspired to draw a set of unkind caricatures of Mam’zelle Rougier, which the French mistress unfortunately sees. Mam’zelle storms off to complain to Miss Grayling, prompting the Second Formers to send a delegation to follow her and apologise. Matters are resolved when Mam'zelle Dupont intervenes, proclaiming her warm friendship with Mam'zelle Rougier and accepting her views on the casting for the French plays.

Meanwhile, Ellen continues to worry about her work and is frustrated when her requests for extra tuition are refused. In despair, she has the idea of cheating by viewing the examination questions in advance.  At the same time, personal possessions are going missing. Emily loses a brooch, Katie loses a necklace and Gwen, Mary-Lou and Betty all lose purses. Alicia remembers finding Ellen rummaging in Miss Parker’s desk and begins to suspect Ellen of being the thief. She shares her suspicions with the other girls and publicly challenges Ellen.

Ellen is shocked at the accusation. Having almost decided to abandon her cheating idea, she is overcome with anger and decides that, if the others believe her to be bad, then she may as well be bad. She sneaks downstairs, but disturbs Darrell who follows her and finds her with the exam papers. Darrell loses her temper and a struggle ensues. Darrell accuses Ellen of being a thief and a cheat. After this encounter, Ellen becomes sick with worry and seeks out Matron, who places her in the Sanatorium. In the morning, the other girls believe
Ellen has been expelled.

Mary-Lou offers to post a parcel for Daphne and sets off for the post office in a windy, stormy night. She does not return and Daphne sets off to find her. A search party is sent out and both Daphne and Mary Lou are found, clinging to the edge of a cliff. Daphne had prevented Mary-Lou from falling and is regarded as a heroine.

Darrell, Sally, Irene and Belinda set off the next day to find Daphne's parcel. It contains the missing purses and jewellery. They report to Miss Grayling and Daphne is revealed as the thief. Miss Grayling is surprised at the girls' belief that Ellen has been expelled and realises there is a problem with Ellen that needs to be resolved.

Miss Grayling speaks to Daphne. She tells her that she has received confidential reports from her previous schools and knows she has a history of stealing and lying about her family's wealth. However, Miss Grayling also tells Daphne that, by her actions, she has proved she has good in her. Miss Grayling makes Daphne an offer: if she is to remain at Malory Towers, she must confess everything to the Second Form girls and ask for their support to remain. Daphne does so. The girls decide that Daphne's heroism has earned her another chance. Miss Grayling speaks to Ellen and is relieved that overwork is at the root of her problems.

The term comes to a close, with Mary-Lou and Daphne now firm friends.

Characters

North Tower First Form girls 

 Darrell Rivers - A new girl at Malory Towers and the main protagonist of the stories. She has long brown hair and is jolly and sensible.
 Gwendoline Mary Lacey - Another new girl, who turns out to be spoiled, lazy, boastful and spiteful. She is described as having blonde hair and blue eyes.
 Sally Hope - the third new girl, initially prim and withdrawn
 Alicia Johns - A lively, quick-witted prankster, always ready with an opinion. Alicia is often criticised for her sharp and sometimes needlessly harsh tongue.
 Mary Lou Linnet - A quiet, shy girl, described as having "big, scared eyes". At the end of First Term at Malory Towers, she learns to stand up for herself.
 Katherine - Head girl of the First Form, tall, dark and quietly spoken. She is kind and sensible.
 Emily Lake - A quiet and studious girl, clever at sewing.
 Irene Edwards - A scatterbrained girl who excels at music and mathematics.
 Jean Dunlop - A jolly, shrewd Scottish girl, able at handling money for various school societies and charities.
 Violet Dawson - Described as shy and colourless, very much left out of things
 Belinda Morris - a new girl, described as having black curly hair, cut short like a boy. Marvellous at painting and sketching.
 Ellen Wilson - a new girl who is described as tall and thin. A scholarship girl, who is smart but often worries about her work.
 Daphne Millicent Turner - pretty, graceful and charming. Curly blonde hair. Is friends with Gwendoline Mary Lacey for a while, but then becomes best friends with Mary-Lou.

Other girls 

 Betty Hill - Alicia's friend in West Tower
 Pamela - Head Girl of North Tower
 Marilyn - Sixth former, captain of games

Mistresses and Staff 

 Miss Grayling - Headmistress of Malory Towers.
 Miss Potts - House Mistress of North Tower and mistress of the First Form.
 Mam'zelle Dupont - French mistress, described as "short, fat and round," with a jolly temperament. She is the victim of many tricks and pranks by Alicia and the other first formers.
 Mam'zelle Rougier - French mistress, described as "thin and sour," with an ill-humoured temperament. Unlike the other Mam
 Miss Linnie - Art mistress
 Mr Young - Music teacher
 Miss Carton - History mistress
 Miss Remmington - Games mistress
 Matron - North Tower Matron, responsible for the well-being of the girls boarding in North Tower. She is warm and kind, but can be very stern about the girls taking their medicine.

Other characters 

 Mr Rivers - Darrell's father, a surgeon.
 Mrs Rivers - Darrell's mother.
 Felicity Rivers - Darrell's younger sister.
 Mrs Lacey - Gwendoline's mother.
 Miss Winter - Gwendoline's former governess.
 Mr Hope - Sally's father.
 Mrs Hope - Sally's mother.
 Gardener - described as a "hefty gardener," a member of the search party sent to find Daphne and Mary-Lou

References

External links

 Enid Blyton Society page
 Review by Laura Canning from www.enidblyton.net
 BBC – h2g2 – 'Malory Towers' – by Enid Blyton

1947 British novels
1947 children's books
Methuen Publishing books
Novels by Enid Blyton